The Community Union Defence League (CUDL) is an Australian mutual aid group which operates under the principles of Marxism-Leninism and is guided by the Australian Communist Party.

CUDL currently operates in Sydney, Melbourne, Adelaide, Brisbane, and Coffs Harbour, where their weekly street kitchens hand out over 200 meals.

History

In November 2020, a street kitchen was started by CUDL in Coffs Harbour, in response to the significant homeless community in the area.

In August 2021, CUDL Adelaide were approached by SA's Department of Human Services, and told they would need to relocate their weekly street kitchen to a different part of the city. The Australian Communist Party, and the state Labor opposition questioned the visit from the DHS representative constituted a conflict of interest, after it was found the chief executive also had ties to a pub nearby Whitmore Square.

In September 2021, members of Victoria Police and representatives from the City of Melbourne approached the street kitchen run by CUDL in Melbourne, and ordered them to remove their furniture. CUDL representatives stated they had turned out every week for 2 years, and police were looking for an excuse to shut them down.

References

External links
Official Website
Official Facebook page
Instagram for CUDL Adelaide
Instagram for CUDL for CUDL Coffs Harbour
Instagram for CUDL Melbourne
Instagram for CUDL Sydney

Organisations based in Australia
Communism
General unions
Socialism